Radosevich is an English-language form of surname Radošević. Notable people with the surname include:

George Radosevich (1928–2016), American football player
Michele Radosevich (born 1947), American politician and lawyer
Matt Radosevich, better known as Matt Rad, American record producer, songwriter, and musician